The 2021 NAIA football season is the component of the 2021 college football season organized by the National Association of Intercollegiate Athletics (NAIA) in the United States. The regular season began on August 28 and culminated on November 13. The season's playoffs, known as the NAIA Football National Championship, began on November 20 and culminated with the championship game on December 18 at Durham County Memorial Stadium in Durham, North Carolina.

Conference changes and new programs

Membership changes

Conference standings

Postseason

Bracket

Rankings

See also
 2021 NCAA Division I FBS football season
 2021 NCAA Division I FCS football season
 2021 NCAA Division II football season
 2021 NCAA Division III football season

References